Guotai or Guo Tai is the atonal pinyin romanization of various Chinese words and names, usually in reference to a traditional expression about a peaceful and prosperous era in a country's history.

It may refer to:

Business
 Guotai Junan Securities, a Chinese listed company, a securities broker and an investment bank, that formed by a merger
 Guotai Junan Futures, a subsidiary of Guotai Junan Securities
 Guotai Junan International Holdings, a listed company based in Hong Kong and a subsidiary of Guotai Junan Securities
 Guotai Securities, a predecessor of Guotai Junan Securities
 Cathay Pacific Airways, known as just Cathay Pacific, is a Hong Kong-based airline, also known as its pinyin transliteration of its Chinese name as Guotai hangkong
 Cathay Bank, a United States bank that was specialized for Chinese communities, also known as its pinyin transliteration of its Chinese name  as Guotai Yinhang
 Cathay General Bancorp, parent company of Cathay Bank, a listed company in NASDAQ
 Cathay United Bank, a Taiwanese financial services company, also known as its pinyin transliteration of its Chinese name as Guotai Shihua Yinhang
 Cathay Life Insurance, a Taiwanese insurance company, also known as its pinyin transliteration of its Chinese name as Guotai Renshou
 Cathay Organisation, a Singapore film company, also known as its pinyin transliteration of its Chinese name as Guotai Jigou
 , formerly known as Motion Picture & General Investment, a Hong Kong-based film company and a subsidiary of Cathay Organisation

Buildings
 , a historical landmark movie theatre in Shanghai, also known as its pinyin transliteration of its Chinese name as Guotai Dianyingyuan
 The Cathay, a historical landmark movie theatre in Singapore that was owned by Cathay Organisation
 Cathay City, headquarters of Cathay Pacific Airways

Names
 Guotai (given name), also in the form of Kowk Tai, Kok Thay
  (aka ), a Chinese scholar-official of Eastern Han dynasty
  Qing dynasty Chinese people, also known as his alternative name Guotai
 Lady Wu, a fictional character in the Romance of the Three Kingdoms, Guotai was her nickname

See also
 Cathay (disambiguation)
 Kuo Tai-yuan
 Terry Gou Tai-ming
 Thailand

Romanization of Chinese